McCreery is a surname. It is derived from the Irish and Scottish Gaelic surname Mac Ruidhrí.

People with the surname
 Charles McCreery (born 1942), British psychologist and author
 David McCreery (born 1957), Northern Irish footballer
 Ed McCreery (1889–1960), American Major League Baseball pitcher
 Joey McCreery (1902–1989), American actress and writer, better known as Marion Mack
 John McCreery (disambiguation)
John W. McCreery (1845–1917), West Virginia State Senator
John Alexander McCreery (1884–1948), American surgeon
 Maud Leonard McCreery (1883–1938), American suffragist, pacifist, labor activist, educator and newspaper editor
 Ned McCreery (c. 1945 – 1992), Northern Irish Loyalist paramilitary
 Richard McCreery (1898–1967), British career soldier
 Scotty McCreery (born 1993), American singer
 Thomas McCreery (disambiguation)
Thomas C. McCreery (1816–1890), US Senator from Kentucky
Tom McCreery (1874–1941), US baseball player
 Wayman C. McCreery (1851–1901), American real estate agent, opera composer and internal revenue collector of St. Louis
William McCreery (disambiguation)
William McCreery (Maryland politician) (1750–1814), US Representative from Maryland.
William McCreery (Pennsylvania politician) (1786–1841), US House of Representatives from Pennsylvania.
William B. McCreery (1836–1896)
William C. McCreery (1896–1988), American lawyer and member of the New York State Assembly

Other uses
McCreery, West Virginia

See also
McCreary

Citations

References

Anglicised Irish-language surnames
Anglicised Scottish Gaelic-language surnames
Patronymic surnames